Jean d'Orléans-Longueville  (1484, in Château de Parthenay — 24 September 1533, in Tarascon), Cardinal de Longueville was a cardinal of the Roman Catholic Church for six months in 1533. He was abbot in commendam of Bec, and concurrently archbishop of Toulouse (1503) and bishop of Orléans (1521).

Biography

Jean d’Orléans-Longueville was born in Parthenay in 1484, the third son of François I d'Orléans, Duke of Longueville and Agnes of Savoy.  His older brothers were François II, Duke of Longueville and Louis I d'Orléans, Duke of Longueville.  He was a relative of Louis XI of France and Louis XII of France, the latter of whom provided for his education.

He began his ecclesiastical career as a cleric at Chartres Cathedral.  On November 29, 1503, he was elected Archbishop of Toulouse.  He was the administrator of the archdiocese until he reached the canonical age of 27.  He received the pallium on August 14, 1517 and then occupied the see until his death.  On June 26, 1521, he was named Bishop of Orléans.  He also occupied that see until his death.

Pope Clement VII made him a cardinal priest in the consistory of March 3, 1533.  He received the red hat and the titular church of San Martino ai Monti at that time.

In 1533, he was traveling to Marseille to witness Pope Clement VII perform the marriage of Henry, Duke of Orléans and Catherine de' Medici.  He died on the way to Marseille, at Tarascon on September 24, 1533.

References

External links
Salvador Miranda, "Cardinals of the Holy Roman Church"

1484 births
1533 deaths
Archbishops of Toulouse
Bishops of Orléans
16th-century French cardinals